Fort Ware Water Aerodrome  is located adjacent to Fort Ware, British Columbia, Canada.

See also
Fort Ware Airport

References

Seaplane bases in British Columbia
Northern Interior of British Columbia
Peace River Regional District
Registered aerodromes in British Columbia